East Meets West is a cooking show on the Food Network hosted by the Chinese American chef Ming Tsai. During each half-hour episode, Tsai cooked Asian-European fusion cuisine. East Meets West aired from 1998 to 2003. In 1999, Tsai won the Daytime Emmy award in the category Outstanding Service Show Host for the show.

Opening sequence
The opening credits for the show consisted of Tsai doing various things, such as doing yoga, playing tennis, cooking, shopping, hopping out of his van, riding a bicycle, and shopping in an Asian market.

References

External links
 

Food Network original programming
2000s American cooking television series
1998 American television series debuts
2003 American television series endings